

Suaeda is a genus of plants also known as seepweeds and sea-blites. Most species are confined to saline or alkaline soil habitats, such as coastal salt-flats and tidal wetlands. Many species have thick, succulent leaves, a characteristic seen in various plant genera that thrive in salty habitats (halophile plants).

There are about 110 species in the genus Suaeda.

The most common species in northwestern Europe is S. maritima. It grows along the coasts, especially in saltmarsh areas, and is known in Britain as "common sea-blite", but as "herbaceous seepweed" in the USA. It is also common along the east coast of North America from Virginia northward. One of its varieties is common in tropical Asia on the land-side edge of mangrove tidal swamps. Another variety of this polymorphic species is common in tidal zones all around Australia (Suaeda maritima var. australis is also classed as S. australis). On the coasts of the Mediterranean Sea a common Suaeda species is S. vera. This is known as "shrubby sea-blite" in English. It grows taller and forms a bush.

Forsskål's book, Flora Aegyptiaco-Arabica, published 1775, in Latin, declares Suæda as a newly created genus name, with the name taken from an Arabic name Suæd and presents the species members of the new genus.

The genus includes plants using either  or  carbon fixation. The latter pathway evolved independently three times in the genus and is now used by around 40 species. S. aralocaspica, classified in its own section Borszczowia, uses a particular type of  photosynthesis without the typical "Kranz" leaf anatomy.

Uses
In the medieval and early post-medieval centuries it was harvested and burned, and the ashes were processed as a source for sodium carbonate for use in glass-making; see glasswort. In Mexico, some species such as Suaeda pulvinata, called romeritos, are cooked in traditional festive dish named either revoltijo or romeritos, also as other kinds of quelites a generic name for edible herbs part of the polyculture eco-agronomy technology called milpa.

Selected species
Suaeda aegyptiaca
Suaeda aralocaspica – formerly known as Borszczowia aralocaspica
Suaeda asphaltica – Asphaltic seablite
Suaeda australis – Austral seablite
Suaeda calceoliformis – Pursh seepweed, broom seepweed, horned seablite
Suaeda californica – California seablite
Suaeda conferta – beach seepweed
Suaeda corniculata
Suaeda depressa – Alkaki seepweed
Suaeda esteroa – estuary seablite
Suaeda fruticosa
Suaeda glauca
Suaeda japonica 
Suaeda linearis – annual seepweed, narrow-leaf seablite
Suaeda maritima
Suaeda mexicana – Mexican seepweed
Suaeda monoica
Suaeda novae-zelandiae
Suaeda nigra – bush seepweed, romerillo
Suaeda occidentalis – western seepweed
Suaeda palaestina
Suaeda pulvinata
Suaeda rolandii – Roland's seablite
Suaeda salina
Suaeda salsa
Suaeda suffrutescens – desert seepweed
Suaeda tampicensis – coastal seepweed
Suaeda taxifolia – woolly seablite
Suaeda torreyana – iodine weed
Suaeda vera
Suaeda vermiculata

References

USDA Plants Profile: genus Suaeda
GRIN genus Suaeda

 
Halophytes
Amaranthaceae genera
Salt marsh plants
Taxa named by Peter Forsskål
Barilla plants